The 2011–12 season was the 108th season of competitive football in Spain.

The season began on 3 August 2011 for the Copa Federación, 19 August for  Tercera División, 20 August for Segunda División B, 26 August for Segunda División, 27 August for La Liga and 31 August 2011 for the Copa del Rey. Both La Liga and Segunda División had a delayed start after the Association of Spanish Footballers (AFE) called a strike. The season ended on 13 May 2012 for La Liga, 17 June 2012 for Segunda División and 24 June for Segunda División B and Tercera División.

Transfer Windows

Promotion and relegation (pre-season)
Teams promoted to 2011–12 La Liga
 Real Betis
 Rayo Vallecano
 Granada

Teams relegated from 2010–11 La Liga
 Deportivo La Coruña
 Hércules
 Almerí

Teams promoted to 2011–12 Segunda División
 Sabadell
 Real Murcia
 Alcoyano
 Guadalajara

Teams relegated from 2010–11 Segunda División
 Salamanca
 Tenerife
 Ponferradina
 Albacete

Teams promoted to 2011–12 Segunda División B
 Marino de Luanco
 CF Villanovense
 Valencia CF Mestalla
 Burgos CF
 SD Amorebieta
 CD Toledo
 UE Llagostera
 Andorra CF
 RB Linense
 CF Reus Deportiu
 CD Olímpic de Xàtiva
 CD Manacor
 Sporting Villanueva Promesas
 Arandina CF
 UD San Sebastián de los Reyes
 Sestao River Club
 Gimnástica Segoviana CF
 La Roda CF
 Real Zaragoza B
 Huracán Valencia

Teams relegated from 2010–11 Segunda División B
 Universidad LPGC
 Deportivo de La Coruña B
 Pontevedra CF
 Extremadura UD
 AD Cerro Reyes
 Caudal Deportivo
 Cultural Leonesa
 CD La Muela
 Peña Sport FC
 Barakaldo CF
 Alicante CF
 CD Castellón
 Benidorm CF
 UD Alzira
 UDA Gramenet
 FC Santboià
 CD Alcalá
 Unión Estepona CF
 Yeclano Deportivo
 Jumilla CF

National team
The home team is on the left column; the away team is on the right column.

UEFA Euro qualifiers
Spain was in Group I of the Euro 2012 qualification process.

Friendlies

Pre-season tournaments

Honours

Trophy & League Champions

League tables

La Liga

Segunda División

Segunda División B

Tercera División

References